Live at Chelmsford Top Security Prison is a live album by Sex Pistols, released in 1990. It was recorded on 17 September 1976 at the Chelmsford Prison, before Glen Matlock left the band.

The recording featured many non-Sex Pistols overdubs and insertions arranged by the band's early soundman Dave Goodman. These included a canned audio track of a riot (complete with shouting, scuffles, breaking glass, etc.). As the liner notes on the CD say:

Their opening number was "Anarchy"... at the end of the number there was a barrage of catcalls, boos and screaming.

However, the same concert tracks were released (in original play order) on the Sex Pistols: Alive CD without overdubs, contrasting with the Goodman-produced Chelmsford CD.

Track listing 

 Satellite 
 Submission 
 Liar 
 No Fun 
 Pretty Vacant 
 Problems 
 I Wanna Be Me 
 Seventeen 
 New York 
 No Lip 
 Stepping Stone 
 Substitute 
 Anarchy in the Prison 
 Did You No Wrong

External links 
 

Sex Pistols live albums
1990 live albums